Shabani Christophe Nonda (born 6 March 1977) is a former professional footballer who played as a striker. Born in Burundi, he represented the DR Congo national team, earning 36 caps and scoring 20 goals. He was selected for DR Congo's squad for the 2002 Africa Cup of Nations.

Club career
Born in Bujumbura, Burundi, Nonda began his career at Atlético Olympic in 1992. After playing in Tanzania with Young Africans and in South Africa with Vaal Professionals, he was discovered by FIFA agent Marcelo Houseman who then placed Nonda in Switzerland with FC Zürich in 1996 for 

His performances, including those in the 2004 UEFA Champions League Final, earned him a move to Serie A club A.S. Roma on a three-year deal in 2005, for which he earned €1.8 million in gross per season. (however the tax rate including regional tax may have added up to around 50%) However, he never lived up to his potential – partly due to a knee injury sustained while at Monaco – and spent the 2006–07 season on loan at English side Blackburn Rovers. While at Blackburn, Nonda announced his intention to sign a permanent deal, Blackburn opted not to sign Nonda on a permanent deal and he later signed for Turkish club Galatasaray in August 2007 on a two-year deal. On 28 January 2010, Galatasaray released him by mutual consent.

International career
Though he was born in Burundi, Nonda holds citizenship from Democratic Republic of the Congo and to date 36 international caps for the country, with 20 goals since 2000. He retired from international football in 2005, and returned in 2007. He scored a hat-trick against Djibouti in World Cup Qualifications in 2008.

Outside football

Media personality

Throughout his footballing career, Nonda has hosted a DJ show for a Burundian radio station.

Commitment

Nonda is a member of the "Champions for Peace" club, a group of famous elite athletes committed to serving peace in the world through sport, created by Peace and Sport, a Monaco-based international organization.

Career statistics

Club

Honours
Monaco
 Coupe de la Ligue: 2002–03; runner-up: 2000–01
 UEFA Champions League runner-up: 2003–04

Roma
 Supercoppa Italiana: 2007

Galatasaray
 Süper Lig: 2007–08
 Turkish Super Cup: 2008

Individual
 Swiss Super League top scorer: 1997–98 (24 goals)
 Swiss Foreign Footballer of the Year: 1997–98
 Ligue 1 top scorer: 2002–03 (26 goals)
 Ligue 1 Team of the Year: 2002–03

References

External links
 
 
 
 
 
 

1977 births
Living people
Sportspeople from Bujumbura
Democratic Republic of the Congo footballers
Democratic Republic of the Congo international footballers
Democratic Republic of the Congo expatriate footballers
Burundian footballers
Burundian people of Democratic Republic of the Congo descent
Association football forwards
2002 African Cup of Nations players
FC Zürich players
Stade Rennais F.C. players
AS Monaco FC players
Expatriate footballers in France
A.S. Roma players
Blackburn Rovers F.C. players
Galatasaray S.K. footballers
Swiss Super League players
Ligue 1 players
Serie A players
Premier League players
Süper Lig players
Expatriate footballers in England
Expatriate footballers in Italy
Democratic Republic of the Congo expatriate sportspeople in Turkey
Expatriate footballers in Turkey
Burundian expatriate sportspeople in Turkey
Expatriate footballers in Switzerland
Expatriate footballers in Monaco
Young Africans S.C. players
Expatriate footballers in Tanzania